Shanghai United Media Group is a state media company of the People's Republic of China, established on October 28, 2013, through the merger of the city's two largest newspaper groups, Jiefang Daily Press Group and  Wenhui–Xinmin United Press Group, to accelerate media reform and capitalize on the fast growth of Internet media. The media group is overseen by the Shanghai committee of the Chinese Communist Party (CCP).

The Jiefang Daily Press Group (Chinese: , is a Chinese- and English-language media company based on the Jiefang Daily, an official daily newspaper of the Shanghai committee of the CCP.

The Wenhui–Xinmin United Press Group (Chinese: , p Wénhuì–Xīnmín Liánhé Bàoyè Jítuán) is a Chinese- and English-language media company. It was established on July 25, 1998, by the merger of the Xinmin Evening News and the Wenhui Daily. It is the parent company of the English-language Shanghai Daily and publishes foreign editions of its newspapers and magazines in 10 countries, including the United States and Australia.

In October 2020, the United States Department of State designated Jiefang Daily and Xinmin Evening News as foreign missions of the Chinese government.

Publications
There are a variety of publications under the Shanghai United Press Group, including:

Jiefang Daily
Shanghai Students' Post
Shanghai Law Journal
Shanghai Xinmin Evening News
Wenhui Daily
Shanghai Daily
Xinmin Weekly
Oriental Sports Daily
Wenhui Book Review
Xinmin Evening News
Sixth Tone
Oriental Morning Post
Xinmin Evening News Family Weekly
Wen Xue Bao
The Journalist Monthly
Shanghai Yueji
Shanghai Dongfang Newspaper
The Paper

See also
List of newspapers in China

References

External links
 

Newspaper companies of China
Mass media companies established in 2013
Chinese companies established in 2013
Government-owned companies of China
State media
Organizations associated with the Chinese Communist Party
Chinese propaganda organisations